Trüby Trio are a German music group specialising in nu jazz and broken beat. Founded in 1997 by Rainer Trüby, Roland Appel and Christian Prommer, their Latin-influenced sound, integrating bossa nova and flamenco styles, saw the band become pioneers of the nu jazz sound. Their early remixes of artists such as Nitin Sawhney led to the band's own releases on the Compost Records label, with their own work being subject to remixes by artists including Tiefschwarz, Louie Vega and Señor Coconut. The band were asked to compile the DJ-Kicks: Trüby Trio album in 2001, and their debut studio album, Elevator Music, followed in 2003.

Discography

Albums
DJ-Kicks: Trüby Trio (Studio !K7, 2001)
Elevator Music (Compost Records, 2003)
Retreated (Compost Records, 2004)

References

External links
Trüby Trio at Compost Records
Trüby Trio at Discogs

German musical trios
German electronic music groups